A bakery is an establishment that produces and sells flour-based food baked in an oven such as bread, cookies, cakes, donuts, pastries, and pies. Some retail bakeries are also categorized as cafés, serving coffee and tea to customers who wish to consume the baked goods on the premises. Confectionery items are also made in most bakeries throughout the world.

History

Baked goods have been around for thousands of years. The art of baking was developed early during the Roman Empire. It was a highly famous art as Roman citizens loved baked goods and demanded them frequently for important occasions such as feasts and weddings. Because of the fame of the art of baking, around 300 BC, baking was introduced as an occupation and respectable profession for Romans. Bakers began to prepare bread at home in an oven, using mills to grind grain into flour for their breads. The demand for baked goods persisted, and the first bakers' guild was established in 168 BC in Rome. The desire for baked goods promoted baking throughout Europe and expanded into eastern parts of Asia. Bakers started baking bread and other goods at home and selling them on the streets.

This trend became common, and soon, baked products were sold in streets of Rome, Germany, London, and more. A system of delivering baked goods to households arose as the demand increased significantly. This prompted bakers to establish places where people could purchase baked goods. The first open-air market for baked goods was established in Paris, and since then bakeries have become a common place to purchase delicious goods and to socialize. By the colonial era, bakeries were commonly viewed in this way.

On July 7, 1928, a bakery in Chillicothe, Missouri introduced sliced bread using the automatic bread-slicing machine, invented by Otto Frederick Rohwedder. While the bread initially failed to sell, due to its "sloppy" aesthetic, and the fact it went stale faster, it later became popular. In World War II bread slicing machines were effectively banned, as the metal in them was required for wartime use. When they were requisitioned, creating 100 tons of metal alloy, the decision proved very unpopular with housewives.

World War II directly affected the bread industry in the UK. Baking schools closed during this time, so when the war ended there was a lack of skilled bakers. This resulted in new methods being developed to satisfy the world's desire for bread, including chemical additives, premixes and specialised machinery. Old methods of baking were almost completely eradicated when these new methods were introduced and the industry became industrialised. The old methods were seen as unnecessary and financially unsound. During this period there were not many traditional bakeries left.

Specialities 

Some bakeries provide services for special occasions (such as weddings, anniversaries, birthday parties, business networking events, etc.) or customized baked products for people who have allergies or sensitivities to certain foods (such as nuts, peanuts, dairy or gluten, etc.). Bakeries can provide a wide range of cake designs such as sheet cakes, layer cakes, wedding cakes, tiered cakes, etc. Other bakeries may specialize in traditional or hand-made types of baked products made with locally milled flour, without flour bleaching agents or flour treatment agents, baking what is sometimes referred to as artisan bread.

Products 

 Bread
 Bread roll
 Flatbreads
 Bagels
 Donuts
 Muffins
 Pizzas
 Buns
 Pastries
 Pies
 Crumpets
 Tarts
 Brownies
 Cakes
 Croissants
 Cupcakes
 Cookies
 Scones
 Barmbrack
 Soda bread
 Biscuit (bread)
 Crackers
 Biscuits
 Pretzels
 Biscotti
 Kalakukko
 Cornbread
 Pandesal
 Pumpkin bread
 Pita
 Sourdough
 Waffles
 Puff

Commercialization
In many countries, many grocery stores and supermarkets sell "sliced bread" (prepackaged/presliced bread), cakes, and other pastries. They may also offer in-store baking, with products either fully baked on site or part-baked prior to delivery to store, and some offer cake decoration. Nonetheless, many people still prefer to get their baked goods from a small artisanal bakery, either out of tradition, the availability of a greater variety of baked products, or due to the higher quality products characteristic of the trade of baking.

See also

 Bakehouse (building)
 Baker, a person who produces baked goods
 Baking
 Cake decorating
 Cakery
 Coffeehouse
 Konditorei, a German shop that makes, sells and serves cakes, pastries, coffee and tea, in mornings and afternoons
 List of baked goods
 List of bakeries
 List of bakery cafés
 List of doughnut shops
 Pâtisserie, a French or Belgian establishment that specializes in pastries
 Sliced bread (prepackaged/presliced bread)
 Tea house

References

External links 
 
 

Bakeries
Restaurants by type